UTV  is an Iraqi satellite television Network based in Baghdad, Iraq. The channel was launched in 2020 by Sarmad Khanjar. The channel broadcasts several programs, including entertainment, news and cultural.

Program 

 Melon City Show
 U Trending
 U Tour
 Stars on UTV
 Good Morning Show
 In details with Natiq
 Private testimonies
 Small communities
 The good generation
 Hattrick
 With Mulla Talal
 Truth be told with Adnan Taji
 Mayo Clinic Studio

References 

Satellite television
Television networks